Ten Novels and Their Authors is a 1954 work of literary criticism by William Somerset Maugham. Maugham collects together what he considers to have been the ten greatest novels and writes about the books and the authors. The ten novels are:

The History of Tom Jones, a Foundling by Henry Fielding
Pride and Prejudice by Jane Austen
The Red and the Black by Stendhal
Le Père Goriot by Honoré de Balzac
David Copperfield by Charles Dickens
Madame Bovary by Gustave Flaubert
Moby-Dick by Herman Melville
Wuthering Heights by Emily Brontë
The Brothers Karamazov by Dostoevsky
War and Peace by Tolstoy

This book was originally a series of magazine articles commissioned by Redbook.

Notes 

1954 non-fiction books
Books by W. Somerset Maugham
Books of literary criticism
Heinemann (publisher) books